Eternity is the debut full-length studio album released by the American power metal band Kamelot in 1995.

Track listing

Personnel
All information from the album booklet.

Kamelot
Mark Vanderbilt – lead vocals
Thomas Youngblood – guitars, backing vocals
David Pavlicko – keyboards
Glenn Barry – bass guitar
Richard Warner – drums

Additional musicians
Todd Plant – backing vocals
Leroy Meyers – backing vocals
Howard Helm – additional keyboards

Production
Jim Morris – producer, engineering
Dave Wehner – assistant engineer
Steve Heritage – assistant engineer
Jeff MacDonald – assistant engineer
Buni Zubaly – photography
Chrissy Orsini – clothing
Rachel Youngblood – design, illustration

References

1995 debut albums
Kamelot albums
Noise Records albums
Albums recorded at Morrisound Recording